Hergelim Ra'im (Hebrew: הרגלים רעים, English translation: Bad Habits) is the second studio album by the Israeli musician Yoni Bloch, released in 2007.

The band members that accompany Bloch in this album are Tomer Lahav (Guitar), Tal Zovleski (Guitar), Ariel Armoni (Drums), Tal Kirshboim (Bass guitar), Daniel Koren (Piano) and others. In this album, comparing to his previous album, Bloch didn't collaborate with the singer Efrat Gosh. Most of the texts of the album were written by Barak Feldaman, in cooperation with Bloch. The songs combine characteristics of rock music, such as electric guitar and yells, along with melodic Piano solos, played by Bloch himself. Some of the album songs released before the official album release, in Bama Hadasha website.

Song List 
Most of the songs in the album were written by Barak Feldman and Yoni Bloch. All the songs were composed by Yoni Bloch.

References 

2007 albums
Yoni Bloch albums